The Humble Brothers are an electronic music duo consisting of Canadian Ken "hiwatt" Marshall and Tanzanian-born Traz Damji. They gained fame with their involvement in Electronic Arts soundtracks, starting with 2002's Need for Speed: Hot Pursuit 2. Two big projects followed, SimCity 4 and its expansion pack, Rush Hour, then remixes of other artists' songs as their production skills were noticed by the mainstream music industry. Their notable remixes include Linkin Park's "One Step Closer" ("1Stp Klosr") and Static-X/Mephisto Odyssey song "Crash" which was featured on the soundtrack of Batman Beyond: Return of the Joker. The Humble Brothers have also remixed the Dry Cell song Body Crumbles. They are also responsible for producing "Terror Is Reality" for the Capcom video game Dead Rising 2.

The Humble Brothers continue to produce music for video games, television, and remix albums.

Albums
 Speed (2009)
 Cinematix (2009)
 Gravity Well - the Soundtrack (2009)
 In Game (2006)

External links
The Humble Brothers website

American electronic music groups